Lyceum Alpinum Zuoz is an international boarding school in Zuoz, near St.Moritz in Switzerland. Founded in 1904, it is located in the upper part of the alpine village in the area of Surmulins.  There are around 300 pupils, including 220 in the boarding houses. The boarders originate from over 30 countries, such as Italy, Russia, Germany and the United States.

History 
Founded in 1904, Lyceum Alpinum is one of the oldest private boarding schools in Switzerland.

The school was founded by a group of locals from the Engadine as an institution for ailing boys, whose parents were spending their vacation in St.Moritz, so that they could benefit from the mountain air and did not fall behind in any of their subjects. It was at the time called the "Institut Engiadina", and had 22 students in its first year and was run by a director and two teachers.

However, it very soon developed into a fully-fledged secondary school for boys - later on girls were also admitted and the school attained its international reputation. It is attended by around 200 boarders and 100 day pupils from the region. The pupils are between 11 and 21 years old. It is known for its cultural diversity and extensive sports programme; the pupils themselves come abroad from over 30 different countries, most frequently from Germany, Russia, China and Austria.

Academic curriculum 
Students at the school can study for internationally recognised higher education entrance qualifications. On offer are the Swiss Matura (German or German/English), the German Abitur and, exclusively in English, the International Baccalaureate.

About three hundred students between 12 and 18 years of age from around the world follow programmes leading to the International Baccalaureate Diploma (IB), the Swiss Matura (German) or the bilingual Swiss Matura (German/English) and German Abitur. Tolerance, fair play and respect for community values are at the heart of a Lyceum education.

Facilities 

The schools consists of 5 boarding houses:
 Grosshaus
 Kleinhaus
 Mittelhaus
 Chesa Urezza
 Chesa Arpiglia

Theatre 
The school has had its own amateur theatre since 2006. The German-speaking Shakespeare Company performs, amongst other things, plays written by this British dramatist. The English Theatre Company develop their stage plays from scratch themselves and perform  only in English. In December 2011 the Zuoz Globe was opened – the only permanent theatre in the Engadine.

The Zuoz Club 
The Zuoz Club is the alumni organisation related to the Lyceum Alpinum Zuoz. It was founded in 1923. The Zuoz Club consists of former students of the Lyceum Alpinum Zuoz. Presently, the alumni organisation has 2,200 members in 42 countries and is divided in 18 regional groups worldwide.

Notable former pupils
 Ernie Blake (1913–1989), founder of Taos Ski Valley, New Mexico
 Karlheinz Böhm
 Chris von Rohr
 Götz George
 Thomas Gold
 André Gorz
 Wilfrid Israel
 Ulrich Körner
 Hans-Adam II, Prince of Liechtenstein
 Anton Piëch
 Ferdinand Piëch
 Gunter Sachs
 Michael White, British theatrical impresario and film producer
 Anton-Wolfgang Graf von Faber-Castell, former CEO of Faber-Castell

See also 
 Institut Le Rosey
 Collège Alpin International Beau Soleil
 Aiglon College
 Institut Auf Dem Rosenberg
Ecole D'Humanité

References

External links
http://www.lyceum-alpinum.ch
http://www.graubuendenkultur.ch/de_DE/address/lyceum_alpinum_grosses_haus_und_osttrakt.31783

International schools in Switzerland
Private schools in Switzerland
Boarding schools in Switzerland
International Baccalaureate schools in Switzerland
Co-educational boarding schools
 
Zuoz